Marshy Hope   is a community in the Canadian province of Nova Scotia, located in  Pictou County. The Cape Breton and Central Nova Scotia Railway (CBNS) passes through Marshy Hope. The railway line was owned and operated by Canadian National Railway (CN) before CN sold the line in October 1993 to RailTex, a shortline railway holding company, which created CBNS to operate the line beginning in 1994.

Notable residents
John Norman Maclean (minister), father of author Norman Maclean who used his father as a character

References

Marshy Hope on Destination Nova Scotia
 Transportation and Infrastructure Renewal

Communities in Pictou County
General Service Areas in Nova Scotia